Piero Baglia-Bamberghi (12 March 1928 – 30 October 1994) was an Italian field hockey player. He competed in the men's tournament at the 1952 Summer Olympics.

He died in his home town of Milan in 1994.

References

External links
 

1928 births
1994 deaths
Italian male field hockey players
Olympic field hockey players of Italy
Field hockey players at the 1952 Summer Olympics
Sportspeople from Milan